Clyne may refer to:

People
 Clyne (surname) (includes listing for Clynes)

Places

United Kingdom
 Clyne, Neath Port Talbot, Wales
 Clyne, Highland, in Highland council area
 Clyne Castle, Swansea, Wales
 Clyne Common, lowland area of common land in the Gower Peninsula, Wales
 Clyne Gardens, botanical garden, Swansea, Wales
 Clyne River, river in Swansea, Wales
 Clyne Valley Country Park, Swansea, Wales

Fictional characters 
 Lacus Clyne, in Mobile Suit Gundam Seed anime franchise
 Siegel Clyne, in Mobile Suit Gundam Seed anime franchise

Others
Roger Clyne and the Peacemakers, rock band from Tempe, Arizona, USA

See also 
 Cline (disambiguation)
 Kline (disambiguation)
 Klein (disambiguation)